Novodevichye is a rural locality (a village) in Lipovskoye Rural Settlement, Kirillovsky District, Vologda Oblast, Russia. The population was 38 as of 2002.

Geography 
Novodevichye is located 21 km northwest of Kirillov (the district's administrative centre) by road. Alexeyevskaya is the nearest rural locality.

References 

Rural localities in Kirillovsky District